Giles Gherson is a Canadian civil servant and journalist. He was editor-in-chief of the Edmonton Journal and Toronto Star newspapers. He has worked as a civil servant in the Ontario government since 2007 and is currently the Deputy Minister of Ontario's Ministry of Economic Development and Growth and Ministry of Research, Innovation and Science.

Early life
Gherson and a twin sister were born in London, England to Joan and Randolph Gherson.

He earned a BA in history from Queen's University in 1978. He worked on the campus newspaper, The Queen's Journal.

Career

Journalism
Gherson worked as a journalist for more than 20 years. He was business editor of The Globe and Mail.

He was editor-in-chief of the Edmonton Journal. He was editor-in-chief of the Toronto Star from 2004 to 2006.

Civil service 
Gherson was principal secretary for social security reform with the Canadian Government at Human Resources Development Canada. He was appointed Deputy Minister of Communications and the Ontario Government's Associate Secretary of
the Cabinet on 8 March 2007.

In July 2008, Gherson was appointed Deputy Minister of Policy and Delivery and Associate Secretary of the Cabinet, and in November 2011 he became Deputy Minister of Government and Consumer Services.

Gherson was appointed Deputy Minister of Research and Innovation and Deputy Minister of Economic Development and Infrastructure in September 2014, and Deputy Minister Responsible for Small Business in January 2017.

Board memberships
Gherson serves on the board of directors of Toronto Financial Service Alliance (TFSA). He is an observer to the board of Next Generation Manufacturing (NGM) Canada. He is an ex officio member of the board of Communitech.

Personal life 
Gherson lives in Toronto, Ontario.

References

External links

Ontario civil servants
21st-century Canadian politicians
Toronto Star people
Canadian newspaper editors
Canadian male journalists
Queen's University at Kingston alumni
Living people
Year of birth missing (living people)